The Twins from Zillertal (German: Die Zwillinge vom Zillertal) is a 1957 West German comedy film directed by Harald Reinl and starring the twins Isa Günther and Jutta Günther, Joachim Fuchsberger and Karin Dor. It takes its title from the Zillertal Valley in Tyrol. It was shot in Eastmancolor at the Bavaria Studios in Munich with location shooting in Austria at the Schloss Matzen, Krimml Waterfalls, Zell am Ziller and Innsbruck. The film's sets were designed by the art director Arne Flekstad. It was part of the post-Second World War boom in Heimatfilm.

Cast
 Isa Günther as 	Christel
 Jutta Günther as 	Reserl
 Joachim Fuchsberger as 	Franz von Auerstein
 Karin Dor as 	Daniela Kleemann
 Hans Moser as 	Herr Schmauss
 Margarete Haagen as 	Baronin von Auerstein
 Werner Finck as 	Herr Kleemann
 Albert Rueprecht as 	Hans Burger
 Wolfgang Gruner as 	Konstantin Opel
 Theodor Danegger as 	Gschwandtner
 Viktor Afritsch as 	Raban
 Franz Loskarn as Ein Jäger
 Luitgard Diesch as 	Zenzi
 Alice Kessler as 	Guest appearance
 Ellen Kessler as 	Guest appearance
 Hans Terofal as 	Gast im 'Roten Adler'

References

Bibliography 
 Bock, Hans-Michael & Bergfelder, Tim. The Concise CineGraph. Encyclopedia of German Cinema. Berghahn Books, 2009.
 Pöschl, Kristina, Trescher, Miriam &  Weber, Reinhard. Harald Reinl: der Regisseur, der Winnetou, Edgar Wallace und die Nibelungen ins Kino brachte : eine Bio- und Filmografie. 2011.

External links 
 

1957 films
1957 comedy films
German comedy films
West German films
1950s German-language films
Films directed by Harald Reinl
Constantin Film films
Films shot at Bavaria Studios
Films set in Austria
Films shot in Austria
1950s German films